This is a list in alphabetical order of cricketers who have played for Sri Lanka Air Force Sports Club in top-class matches since it acquired first-class status in March 1989. Where there is an article, the link comes before the club career span, and the scorecard name (typically initials and surname) comes after. If no article is present, the scorecard name comes before the span.

H
 S. C. Hawavitharana (2022 to 2022–23)
 H. M. R. Herath (1989–90)
 D. I. Hettiarachchi (2009–10)
 P. C. Hewage (2010–11 to 2014–15)
 A. L. Himbutugoda (2018–19 to 2020–21)
 K. H. Hiranya (2022)

T
 Dilip Tharaka (2016–17 to 2018–19) : S. H. D. Tharaka
 Roscoe Thattil (2011–12 to 2022–23) : R. P. Thattil
 Praneeth Hewage (2004–05) : U. H. P. Thimanka
 Charith Tissera (2000–01 to 2005–06) : W. C. R. Tissera

References

Sri Lanka Air Force Sports Club